Otto Eckstein (August 1, 1927 – March 22, 1984) was a German-American economist. He was a key developer and proponent of the theory of core inflation , which proposed that in determining accurate metrics of long run inflation, the transitory price changes of items subject to volatile pricing, such as food and energy, are to be excluded from computation.

Eckstein was born in Germany in 1927 to a Jewish business family.
In 1938, when he was 11 years old, he and several other family members fled the Nazi regime, first emigrating to England, and then, a year later, moving to the United States, where he made his permanent home. He held an A.B. from Princeton University and a Ph.D. from Harvard University and became a Harvard University economics professor, an economic consultant to President Lyndon Baines Johnson, and a member of the President's Council of Economic Advisers from 1964 to 1966. In 1969, he and Donald Marron co-founded Data Resources Inc., the largest non-governmental distributor of economic data in the world, which built and maintained the largest macroeconometric model of the era. In 1975 he was elected as a Fellow of the American Statistical Association. In 1979 he sold DRI for over $100 million to McGraw Hill.

Eckstein was married and had three children. He died of cancer in 1984, at the age of 56.

Bibliography 
    "Water and Resource Development," 1958
    "Inflation, the Wage-Price Spiral and Economic Growth", 1958, in Relationship of Prices to Economic Stability and Growth
    "Staff Report on Employment, Growth and Price Levels," 1959.
    "A Simulation of the U.S. Economy in Recession", with J. S. Duesenberry and G. Fromm, 1960, Econometrica
    "The Determination of Money Wages in American Industry", with T. Wilson, 1962, QJE
    "The Price Equation", with G. Fromm, 1968, AER
    "The Inflation Process in the United States", with R. Brinner, 1972, 
    "Industry Price Equations", with D. Wyss, 1972, in Eckstein, editor, Econometrics of Price Determination
    "The Data Resources Model: Uses, structure, and the analysis of the US economy", with E.W. Green and A. Sinai, 1974, in Klein and Burmeister, editors, Econometric Model Performance
    "Econometric Models and the Formation of Business Expectations", 1976,  Challenge
    "National Economic Information Systems for Developed Countries", 1977, in Perlman, editor, Organization and Retrieval of Economic Knowledge
    "The Great Recession," 1978
    "Long-Term Properties of the Price-Wage Mechanism in the United States, 1891 to 1977", with J. Girola, 1978, REStat
    "Public Finance," 1979.
 
    "Econometric Models for Forecasting and Policy Analysis: The present state of the art", 1981, in Kmenta, editor "Large-Scale Macroeconometric Models"

References

External links 
 Otto Eckstein, 1927-1984 profile at the New School
 NBER tribute by Allen Sinai

1927 births
1984 deaths
United States Council of Economic Advisers
German emigrants to the United States
Harvard University faculty
Harvard University alumni
20th-century American economists
Fellows of the Econometric Society
Fellows of the American Statistical Association
Princeton University alumni